Igor Kurjački (1968–2020) was a Serbian politician and former regional agriculture secretary.  He was the leader of the Vojvodina's Party and coalition "Vojvodina parties", which participated on 2007 Serbian parliamentary election. Igor Kurjački was previously a member of Social Democratic League of Vojvodina which he had left.

References

1968 births
2020 deaths
League of Social Democrats of Vojvodina politicians
Vojvodina's Party politicians
Politicians from Novi Sad